Mato Correia is a village in the northeastern part of the island of Santiago, Cape Verde. It is part of the municipality of São Miguel. It is located southwest of Espinho Branco, 1.5 km north of Pilão Cão and 5 km northwest of São Miguel. In 2010 its population was 328.

References

Villages and settlements in Santiago, Cape Verde
São Miguel, Cape Verde
Populated coastal places in Cape Verde